Dravo Corporation was a shipbuilding company with shipyards in Pittsburgh and Wilmington, Delaware. It was founded by Frank and Ralph Dravo in Pittsburgh in 1891.  The corporation went public in 1936 and in 1998 it was bought out by Carmeuse for $192 million ($ million today). On March 5, 1942, it became the first corporation to receive the Army-Navy "E" Award for outstanding war time production. Dravo ranked 72nd among United States corporations in the value of World War II military production contracts.

Facilities
Neville Island shipyard, Pittsburgh   started 1919, constructed LST's during World War II employing 16,000 people, closed 1982.
Wilmington Shipyard, Delaware  employed 10,500 during World War II, constructing Destroyer escorts. Now closed. Traces back to Harlan and Hollingsworth

Ships
From 1942 to 1945 Dravo Corporation built Landing Ship, Tank, (LST).  LST were built to support amphibious operations able to land tanks, vehicles, cargo, and landing troops on to beaches. No docks or piers were required for these amphibious assaults. The LST had a special bow with a large door that could open. Then a ramp was installed for unloading allied vehicles. The LST had a flat keel, so it could be beached and stay upright. The propellers and rudders were  protected from grounding damage. Many were used in the Pacific War and in the European theatre, especially on Battle of Normandy. In 1942 and 1943 Dravo Corporation also built Submarine chasers.

 Pittsburgh yard
 3 of 148 s
  ... 
 16 of 343 s
 490 - 495, 573, 592 - 595
 1593 - 1597 (see )
 146 of 1052 Landing Ship Tank
 1 - 60 (except 6, 16, 21, 25)
 730 - 753, 775 - 796, 884 - 905, 1038 - 1059
 Wilmington yard
 15 of 72 s
  ... 
 4 of 343 s
 PC-574 - PC-577
 LST6, LST16, LST21, LST25
 65 of 558 Landing Ship Medium
 LSM-201 - LSM-232, LSM-414 - LSM-446

See also 
 James v. Dravo Contracting Co.
 :Category:Ships built by Dravo Corporation

References

External links

Heinz History Center Library and Archives
Dravo - Wilmington
Bethlehem - Wilmington (activity prior to Dravo)
Dravo - Pittsburgh
Final Remedial action for cleanup at Wilmington 
Historical Marker

Defunct shipbuilding companies of the United States
Defunct companies based in Pennsylvania
Manufacturing companies based in Pittsburgh
Manufacturing companies established in 1891
1891 establishments in Pennsylvania
Manufacturing companies disestablished in 1998
1998 disestablishments in Pennsylvania
Ships built by Dravo Corporation